Christopher David Paddie (born February 18, 1974) is an American politician from Marshall, Texas. He previously served as a Texas state representative for District 9 in East Texas.

Service 
Paddie is a former  mayor and city commissioner of Marshall, the county seat of  Harrison County. He is the current general manager of KMHT radio, for which he hosts a daily talk show. He is the former chairman of the Greater Marshall Chamber of Commerce and president of the Boys and Girls Club of the Big Pines. Paddie unseated the incumbent state Representative Wayne Christian, now one of the three members of the Texas Railroad Commission, in the Republican primary election held in 2012.

Paddie ran without opposition in the general election held on November 6, 2018.

A Republican, he resigned his seat in the chamber on March 8, 2022.  He announced in September 2021 that he would not seek re-election after he was redistricted out of his seat in the House.

Political views 
Paddie voted for Senate Bill 5, which would ban abortions after twenty weeks and would require doctors to have admitting privileges at hospitals within thirty miles of their office. Parts of the law were declared unconstitutional by the Supreme Court in Whole Woman's Health v. Hellerstedt.

In May 2021, Paddie killed legislation that would have banned taxpayer-funded lobbying of the legislature. He procedurally postponed the bill's consideration to the birthday of the legislation’s main supporter, State Representative Mayes Middleton.

Personal life 
Paddie was born in Center, Texas, and reared in Carthage. He graduated from Carthage High School and Texas A&M University with a bachelor’s degree in Industrial Distribution.

After graduation, Paddie moved to Houston, where he sold safety equipment and industrial products. While in Houston, he married Brooke Hanszen, his high school sweetheart. The Paddies returned home to East Texas and settled in Marshall, where he became the general manager of the KMHT radio station.

Paddie was elected to the Marshall City Commission in 2008. He was selected by his colleagues to be mayor.

Paddie was first elected to the Texas House, District 9, in November 2012 and was re-elected to subsequent terms in 2014 and 2016.

References

External links
 Campaign website
 State legislative page
 Chris Paddie at the Texas Tribune

1974 births
Living people
Texas city council members
Mayors of places in Texas
Republican Party members of the Texas House of Representatives
Baptists from Texas
American radio personalities
21st-century American politicians
People from Marshall, Texas
People from Center, Texas
People from Houston